Flintshire Observer, was a Weekly newspaper published mainly in English. It was first Published in Holywell in 1857 as the  Flintshire Observer, Mining Journal and General Advertiser. From 1913 it was known as the Flintshire Observer and News and the paper was eventually incorporated into the North Wales Chronicle in 1964.

References

Newspapers published in Wales
1857 establishments in Wales